Cynoscephalae (meaning "dog's heads") may refer to:

Geography
Cynoscephalae (Boeotia), a town of ancient Boeotia
Cynoscephalae (Thessaly), a town of ancient Thessaly
Cynoscephalae Hills (Boeotia), a range of hills in ancient Boeotia
Cynoscephalae Hills (Thessaly), a range of hills in ancient Thessaly (where the battles below were fought)

History
 Battle of Cynoscephalae (197 BC), between Rome and Macedon
 Battle of Cynoscephalae (364 BC), between Thebes and Thessaly

See also
 Battle of Cynossema (411 BC), between Sparta and Athens